The $5,000,000 Counterfeiting Plot is a 1914 silent film thriller directed by  Bertram Harrison.

Synopsis
A member of a counterfeiting gang gives a forged note to his daughter. When she spends it on a dress the note ends up in the hands of the secret service, who then bring the entire gang to justice.

Cast

References

External links

1914 films
American silent feature films
1910s thriller films
American black-and-white films
American thriller films
Silent thriller films
1910s American films